Sharon Mazarello (born 29 June 1965), is a tiatrist, singer, screenwriter, director and actor, hailing from the coastal state of Goa, India.

Education
Mazarello holds a Bachelor of Arts in Psychology from Bombay University. She also holds the Grades I, II & III of music from the Trinity College Of Music, London.

Career
Mazarello debuted in the tiatr Devan Sanddunk Nam in 1979 with a cameo appearance opposite tiatrist Jacinto Vaz. This tiatr was produced by her husband, Wilson (Wilmix) Mazarello. In this tiatr, she sang the song Dhovo Parvo, her first solo.

Since then, Mazarello has sung in many tiatrs, musical programmes, movies, and even on radio and television shows. She has also released many albums. The languages she has sung in include Konkani, Marathi, Hindi and English. She has over 27 audio CDs and one Konkani music DVD, Durig, to her credit.

Mazarello has acted in more than 150 tiatrs. She has also acted in plays on radio, television and in local videos and films, in both Konkani and English. She has even written and directed many tiatrs and plays and founded the 'Theatre Art & Cultural Training Institute' in Margao for training young theatre artistes.

In 2010, Mazarello wrote, directed, sang and acted in the Konkani film, Tum Kitem Kortolo Aslo?. With this film, Mazarello became the first woman to direct a Konkani movie. She has also made a short film titled Cheddum....The Girl. She has also acted in the Bollywood film Dum Maaro Dum.

In 2018, she released the tiatr, Tukai Tench Assa, a story about old age.

Filmography

Films
Tum Kitem Kortolo Aslo? (2010)
Cheddum....The Girl (short film)
Dum Maaro Dum (2011) (as actor)

Further reading

References

External links
 
 Sharon Mazarello profile on Tiatr.in

Living people
Tiatrists
Goan Catholics
Singers from Goa
Konkani-language singers
Indian women playback singers
Women musicians from Goa
Film directors from Goa
Indian women screenwriters
Konkani-language film directors
21st-century Indian film directors
People from South Goa district
21st-century Indian women singers
21st-century Indian singers
20th-century Indian women singers
20th-century Indian singers
1965 births